This is a list of Michelin starred restaurants in Seoul, South Korea. Restaurants that have or had at least one Michelin star are mentioned here, since the debut of the 2017 guide in November 2016.

Summary

List of restaurants

References

External links
 

Michelin starred restaurants in Seoul